State Route 796 (SR 796) is a state highway in Humboldt County, Nevada serving the Winnemucca area.

Route description
State Route 796 begins at the main entrance to the Winnemucca Municipal Airport southwest of downtown Winnemucca in Grass Valley. From there, the highway travels northwest, crossing over Union Pacific Railroad tracks and ending at an Interstate 80 frontage road.

History
SR 796 became a state highway on May 1, 1997.

Major intersections

See also

References

796
Transportation in Humboldt County, Nevada
Winnemucca, Nevada